Carlos R. Cisneros (May 13, 1948 – September 17, 2019) was an American politician who served as a member of the New Mexico Senate for the 6th district from 1985 to 2019.

During his career in the Senate, Cisneros served as chair of the interim Revenue Stabilization and Tax Policy Committee and vice-chair of the Senate Finance Committee.

Cisneros died on September 17, 2019, aged 71.

References

External links 
 Senator Carlos R. Cisneros - (D) at New Mexico Legislature
 Carlos Cisneros at Project Vote Smart
 Follow the Money – Carlos R Cisneros
 2008 2006 2004 2002 2000 1996 1992 campaign contributions

1948 births
2019 deaths
Hispanic and Latino American state legislators in New Mexico
Democratic Party New Mexico state senators
21st-century American politicians
20th-century American politicians
People from Taos County, New Mexico